The Ghana Player of the Year (or Ghanaian Footballer of the Year) is an annual award from Football Association of Ghana, govern in recognition of excellence to the best Ghanaian professional association footballer of the year.

The title has been awarded yearly in Ghana since 1975. The award is determined annually by the members of the Sport Writers Association of Ghana (SWAG), with additional votes from the Ghana Premier League team captains and coaches, in collaboration with Goal.com's corporate subdivision of Perform Group, and is published by the Ghana Football Association (GFA). All Ghanaian professional association footballers all eligible. The award has been presented on 28 occasions as of 2020.

The most successful player of the award is Samuel Kuffour, who was chosen as Ghana Player of the Year three times. Asamoah Gyan, André Ayew, Stephen Appiah, Kwadwo Asamoah and Thomas Partey have each won the award twice, the latter three all in consecutive years.

Winners

Footballer of the Year (Home Based)

Footballer of the Year (Foreign)

Breakdown of winners

Number of wins by player

Number of wins by league

Number of wins by club

Number of wins by position

References

Notes

External links
 all Players of the Year at Worldfootball.net

Association football player of the year awards by nationality
Footballers in Ghana
1975 establishments in Ghana
Awards established in 1975
Ghanaian awards
Annual events in Ghana
Association football player non-biographical articles